Paul Vincent McKenzie (born 22 September 1964) is a Scottish former footballer, who played for Partick Thistle, Ayr United, Albion Rovers, Falkirk, Dumbarton, and Hamilton Academical.

References

1964 births
Scottish footballers
Dumbarton F.C. players
Partick Thistle F.C. players
Albion Rovers F.C. players
Ayr United F.C. players
Falkirk F.C. players
Hamilton Academical F.C. players
Scottish Football League players
Living people
Association football defenders